Gorny District (Gornay uluuha) is an administrative and municipal district (raion, or ulus), one of the thirty-four in the Sakha Republic, Russia. It is located in the center of the republic and borders Vilyuysky and Kobyaysky Districts in the north, Namsky District and the territory of the city of republic significance of Yakutsk in the east, Khangalassky District in the south, Olyokminsky District in the southwest, and Verkhnevilyuysky District in the west. Its administrative center is the rural locality (a selo) of Berdigestyakh. As of the 2010 Census, the total population of the district was 11,706, with the population of Berdigestyakh accounting for 55.2% of that number.

Geography 
The main rivers in the district are the Sinyaya, Kenkeme, Khanchaly, Tyugyuene, Matta and Sitte, all of which are tributaries of the Lena.

Climate

History
The district was established on June 25, 1931.

Administrative and municipal status
Within the framework of administrative divisions, Gorny District is one of the thirty-four in the republic. The district is divided into nine rural okrugs (naslegs) which comprise sixteen rural localities. As a municipal division, the district is incorporated as Gorny Municipal District. Its nine rural okrugs are incorporated into nine rural settlements within the municipal district. The selo of Berdigestyakh serves as the administrative center of both the administrative and municipal district.

Inhabited localities

Economy
The economy of the district is mostly based on agriculture.

Demographics 
As of the 2002 Census, the ethnic composition was as follows:
Yakuts: 95.0%
Russians: 1.8%
Evenks: 1.0%
Evens: 0.5%
others ethnicities: 1.7%

See also 
 Lena Plateau

References

Notes

Sources
Official website of the Sakha Republic. Registry of the Administrative-Territorial Divisions of the Sakha Republic. Gorny District. 

Districts of the Sakha Republic
States and territories established in 1931
1931 establishments in the Soviet Union